Irish cream is a cream liqueur based on Irish whiskey, cream and other flavourings. It typically has an ABV (alcohol by volume) level of 15 to 20% and is served on its own or in mixed drinks, most commonly Irish coffee. Its largest markets are the United Kingdom, Canada and the United States.

It is not a traditional Irish product, as the first version of it, Baileys, was invented by a creative agency working for International Distillers & Vintners's Dublin office in 1973. Nevertheless, within the European Union, Irish cream is a protected geographical indicator product that must be produced in Ireland.

Brands 
Top brands of Irish cream include Baileys, Kerrygold, Carolans and Saint Brendan's. The largest manufacturer is Diageo.

Use
Irish cream is served straight, on the rocks or in mixed drinks, often in combination with Kahlúa in an Irish coffee or hot chocolate. It is also a common addition to White Russians. Some use Irish cream to flavour desserts and other sweet treats.

See also

 Irish coffee, a more traditional Irish whiskey cocktail of similar principle

References

Cream liqueurs
Irish liqueurs
Irish products with protected designation of origin